The 2013 Russia Open Grand Prix was the eleventh grand prix gold and grand prix tournament of the 2013 BWF Grand Prix Gold and Grand Prix. The tournament was held in Sports Hall Olympic, Vladivostok, Russia September 24 until September 29, 2013 and had a total purse of $50,000.

Men's singles

Seeds

  Vladimir Ivanov (champion)
  Brice Leverdez (semi-final)
  Misha Zilberman (quarter-final)
  Vladimir Malkov (quarter-final)
  Zulfadli Zulkiffli (semi-final)
  Iztok Utrosa (third round)
  Jarolim Vicen (third round)
  Nikita Khakimov (quarter-final)

Finals

Top half

Section 1

Section 2

Section 3

Section 4

Bottom half

Section 5

Section 6

Section 7

Section 8

Women's singles

Seeds

  Olga Golovanova (semi-final)
  Natalia Perminova (quarter-final)
  Ksenia Polikarpova (final)
  Aya Ohori (champion)

Finals

Top half

Section 1

Section 2

Bottom half

Section 3

Section 4

Men's doubles

Seeds

  Vladimir Ivanov / Ivan Sozonov (champion)
  Nikita Khakimov / Vasily Kuznetsov (semi-final)

Finals

Top half

Bottom half

Women's doubles

Seeds

  Irina Khlebko / Ksenia Polikarpova (final)
  Elena Komendrovskaja / Maria Shegurova (semi-final)

Finals

Top half

Bottom half

Mixed doubles

Seeds

  Vitalij Durkin / Nina Vislova
  Alexandr Zinchenko / Olga Morozova (second round)
  Vadim Novoselov / Julia Zapolskaya (quarter-final)
  Ryhor Varabyou / Viktoriia Vorobeva (second round)

Finals

Top half

Section 1

Section 2

Bottom half

Section 3

Section 4

References

Open Grand Prix
Sport in Vladivostok
Russia Open Grand Prix
Russian Open (badminton)